Pasadena High School may refer to:

 Pasadena High School (California)
 Pasadena High School (Pasadena, Texas)
 Pasadena High School, South Australia, in Pasadena, South Australia